Platyplectrurus madurensis, commonly known as the Travancore Hills thorntail snake, Palni purple-brown worm thorntail snake, or Madurai shieldtail, is a species of uropeltid snake. It is found in southern India and, depending on the source, Sri Lanka.

Geographic range
P. madurensis is found in the Western Ghats of India and in Sri Lanka.

Type locality of Platyplectrurus madurensis: "About Kodiukarnal on the Pulney Mountains (Madura district), 6000 feet elevation".

Type locality of Wallia inexpectata: "Südindien (Pulney Hills, Madura)".

Type locality of Platyplectrurus ruhanae: "Galle" district in the Southern Province, Sri Lanka.

Description
The dorsum of P. madurensis is iridescent purplish brown. The ventrals and the scales in the two adjoining rows on both sides are white in the center, with purplish brown borders.

The longest of Beddome's type specimens measures  in total length (including tail).

The dorsal scales are in 15 rows at midbody (in 17 rows behind the head). The ventrals number 158-175; and the subcaudals, 10–15.

P. madurensis is very similar to P. trilineatus, except the head shields are shorter, and the supraocular is not longer than the prefrontal. Diameter of body 38-42 times in total length.

Subspecies
Two subspecies are recognized, including the nominate race.

Platyplectrurus madurensis madurensis 
Platyplectrurus madurensis ruhanae 

The subspecific name, ruhanae, refers to the Ancient Sri Lankan Kingdom of Ruhuna (also spelled Ruhana). Some sources consider it to be a separate species.

References

Further reading

Beddome RH (1877). "Descriptions of three new Snakes of the Family Uropeltidae from Southern India". Proc. Zool. Soc. London 1877: 167–168. (Platyplectrurus madurensis, new species, p. 167).
Beddome RH (1886). "An Account of the Earth-Snakes of the Peninsula of India and Ceylon". Ann. Mag. Nat. Hist., Fifth Series 17: 3-33.
Boulenger GA (1890). The Fauna of British India, Including Ceylon and Burma. Reptilia and Batrachia. London: Secretary of State for India in Council. (Taylor and Francis, printers). xviii + 541 pp. (Platyplectrurus madurensis, p. 274).
Das I (2002). A Photographic Guide to Snakes and other Reptiles of India. Sanibel Island, Florida: Ralph Curtis Books. 144 pp. . (Platyplectrurus madurensis, p. 59).
Deraniyagala PEP (1954). "Two new snakes from Ceylon". Proc. 10th Congress Ceylon. Assoc. Advancement Sci. 1: 24.
Smith MA (1943). The Fauna of British India, Ceylon and Burma, Including the Whole of the Indo-Chinese Sub-region. Reptilia and Amphibia. Vol. III.—Serpentes. London: Secretary of State for India. (Taylor and Francis, printers). xii + 583 pp. (Platyplectrurus madurensis, p. 69).
Werner F (1925). "Neue oder wenig bekannte Schlangen aus dem Naturhistorischen Staatsmuseum in Wien. II ". Teil. Sitz. Ber. Akad. Wiss., Wien, Abt. I, 134: 45–66.

Uropeltidae
Reptiles of India
Reptiles described in 1877
Taxa named by Richard Henry Beddome